Dhyaas Parva ( An Era of Yearning) is a 2001 Indian Marathi language biographical drama film about Raghunath Dhondo Karve, written by Chitra Palekar and directed by Amol Palekar. The film stars Kishor Kadam in the lead role, with Seema Biswas, Atul Kulkarni, Sachin Khedekar, and Varsha Usgaokar. The film won the National Film Award for Best Film on Family Welfare.

Plot

Cast
 Kishor Kadam as Raghunath Karve
 Seema Biswas as Malati Karve
 Atul Kulkarni as Gopal Krishna Gokhale
 Sachin Khedekar as Wrangler Paranjpe
 Varsha Usgaokar as Shakuntala Paranjpe
 Sanjay Mone as Babasaheb Ambedkar
 Nishith Dadhich as Congress Activist
 Mohan Gokhale
 Shriram Lagoo
 Samdeep Mehta
 Minal Paranjape
 Sanjay Pawar

References

External links
 

Indian biographical films
2001 films
2000s Marathi-language films
Films directed by Amol Palekar
Best Film on Family Welfare National Film Award winners
2000s biographical films